Payaso is a 1986 Philippine comedy drama film written and directed by Celso Ad. Castillo starring German Moreno as the title role.

Plot 
St. Peter sends his jester (German Moreno) to Earth after he lost his heavenly keys. The jester’s quest is to look for the misplaced keys. As he wandered out in the streets, the happy clown found himself in sadness as he sees the depressing situation of poverty and moral degradation of man. His melancholy worsened after he met the Red Devil who has supernatural powers that he couldn’t even compete with. Depressed, hopeless and defeated, he asks his master to help him and make its presence known to him once more.

Cast 

 German Moreno as Payaso 
 Gene Palomo
 Monique Castillo	
 Strawberry
 Cris Castillo
 Bong Agustin
 Jograd de la Torre
 Mon Alvir
 Gary Lising
 Julie Ann Javier
 Troy Castillo
 Dino Castillo
 Darling Sumayao
 Ruthie Ann Talplacido
 Marife Montilla
 Divine Grace Gallardo
 Jaycee Castillo
 Dave Bronson Tolentino
 Myra Rigs Rinion
 Wynette Bernardo
 Arrizon Matienzo
 Dania De Jesus

Special participation

 Freddie Aguilar
 Jestoni Alarcon
 Steve Alcarado
 Jojo Alejar
 Max Alvarado
 Bing Angeles
 Lito Anzures
 Nora Aunor
 Noel 'Ungga' Ayala
 Babalu
 Inday Badiday
 Wally Bayola
 Maribeth Bichara
 Amay Bisaya
 Cachupoy
 Chiquito
 Ramon Christopher
 Angel Confiado
 Sheryl Cruz
 Edmund Cupcupin
 Richie D'Horsie
 Ramon D'Salva
 Cris Daluz
 Ricky Davao
 Nonong de Andres
 Janice de Belen
 Joseph de Cordova
 Nonoy De Guzman
 Joey de Leon
 Paquito Diaz
 Romy Diaz
 Dolphy
 George Estregan
 Joaquin Fajardo
 Pops Fernandez
 Rudy Fernandez
 Florante
 Freida Fonda
 Joonee Gamboa
 Eddie Garcia
 Boboy Garrovillo
 Janno Gibbs
 Eddie Gicoso
 Eddie Gutierrez
 Mike Hanopol
 Tatlong Itlog
 Allan K
 Sammy Lagmay
 Lito Lapid
 Michael Locsin
 Ike Lozada
 Jose Manalo
 Lollie Mara
 Bert Marcelo
 Leo Martinez
 William Martinez
 Yoyong Martirez
 Eddie Mediavillo
 Rocco Montalban
 Jovit Moya
 Arlene Muhlach
 Nello Nayo
 Martin Nievera
 Lourdes Nuque
 Bert Olivar
 Bobby Ongleo
 Torling Pader
 Dencio Padilla
 Zsa Zsa Padilla
 Palito
 Panchito
 Tina Paner
 Don Pepot
 Fernando Poe Jr.
 Pugak
 Rico J. Puno
 Tiya Pusit
 Rene Requiestas
 Bong Revilla
 Ramon Revilla
 The Reycards Duet
 Manilyn Reynes
 Ronnie Ricketts
 Spanky Rigor
 Susan Roces
 Eddie Rodriguez
 Miguel Rodriguez
 Ruby Rodriguez
 Gloria Romero
 Jose Romulo
 Ruben Rustia
 Leopoldo Salcedo
 Paquito Salcedo
 Eddie Samonte
 Sampaguita
 Jimmy Santos
 Rusty Santos
 Vilma Santos
 Snooky Serna
 Maricel Soriano
 Tito Sotto
 Val Sotto
 Vic Sotto
 Boy Sta. Maria
 Mely Tagasa
 Robert Talby
 Ang Tatlong Pinoy
 Tintoy
 Tessie Tomas
 Rey Tomenes
 Soxy Topacio
 Tugak
 Gary Valenciano
 Helen Vela
 Lou Veloso
 Ronnel Victor
 Nova Villa
 Ivy Violan
 Pablo Virtuoso
 Redford White
 Ramon Zamora

Production 
 Nelson Bartolome  (line producer)
 Angelina C. Dy (executive producer)
 Sixto Dy (executive producer)
 Vehnee Saturno (musical arrangement)

Awards 
Payaso was the only film who won an award at the 1986 Metro Manila Film Festival aside from the actors and actresses. The movie bagged the Best Cinematography Award for the said year. No awards were given for the Best Story and Best Screenplay categories.

References 

Films directed by Celso Ad. Castillo